Jefferson is a city in Jackson County, Georgia, United States. The population was 9,432 at the 2010 census, up from 3,825 at the 2000 census. As of 2019 the estimated population was 12,032. The city is the county seat of Jackson County.

History
Jefferson was founded in 1800. That same year, the seat of Jackson County was transferred to Jefferson from Clarkesboro. Jefferson was incorporated as a town in 1806 and as a city in 1896.  The city was named after Thomas Jefferson.

Geography

Jefferson is located in central Jackson County at  (34.126736, -83.590297). It is bordered to the northwest by Pendergrass and to the southeast by Arcade. U.S. Route 129 passes through the southwest side of the city, leading northwest  to Gainesville and southeast  to Athens. I-85 leads southwest  to Atlanta and northeast  to Greenville, South Carolina.

Curry Creek, a tributary of the North Oconee River, flows just to the east of downtown, and the Middle Oconee River runs along the western edge of the city.

Demographics

2020 census

As of the 2020 United States census, there were 13,233 people, 3,933 households, and 2,885 families residing in the city.

2010 census
As of the census of 2010, there were 9,432 people, 3,328 households, and 2,531 families residing in the city. There were 3,666 housing units, of which 338, or 9.2%, were vacant. The racial makeup of the city was 83.1% white, 10.0% African American, 0.3% Native American, 1.6% Asian, 0.1% Native Hawaiian or Pacific Islander, 3.2% some other race, and 1.8% from two or more races. 7.5% of the population were Hispanic or Latino of any race.

Of the 3,328 households, 46.6% had children under the age of 18 living with them, 59.3% were headed by married couples living together, 12.8% had a female householder with no husband present, and 23.9% were non-families. 20.4% of all households were made up of individuals, and 9.4% were someone living alone who was 65 years of age or older. The average household size was 2.83, and the average family size was 3.28.

In the city, 30.9% of the population were under the age of 18, 6.9% were from 18 to 24, 30.5% from 25 to 44, 20.2% from 45 to 64, and 11.4% were 65 years of age or older. The median age was 33.4 years. For every 100 females, there were 93.0 males. For every 100 females age 18 and over, there were 86.7 males.

For the period 2012–2016, the estimated median annual income for a household was $51,419, and the median income for a family was $58,683. The per capita income for the city was $24,376. Male full-time workers had a median income of $49,832, versus $33,567 for females. 12.5% of the population and 11.7% of families were below the poverty line. 8.5% of the population under the age of 18 and 17.3% of those 65 or older were living in poverty.

Education

Jackson County School District 

The Jackson County School District holds pre-school to grade twelve, and consists of six elementary schools, two middle schools, two high schools, and one charter school. As of December 2020, the district had a total of 8,611 students.

East Jackson Elementary School
Gum Springs Elementary School
Maysville Elementary School
North Jackson Elementary School
South Jackson Elementary School
West Jackson Elementary School
East Jackson Middle School
West Jackson Middle School
East Jackson Comprehensive High School
Jackson County Comprehensive High School
EMPOWER College and Career Center (charter school)

Jefferson City School District 
The Jefferson City School District holds kindergarten to grade twelve, and consists of two elementary schools, a middle school, and a high school. The district has 115 full-time teachers and over 1,525 students.
Jefferson Elementary School
Jefferson Academy
Jefferson Middle School
Jefferson High School

Martin Institute 
The Martin Institute was a school in Jefferson from 1818 to 1942.

Notable people
Chris Beck, pitcher for the New York Mets
Hiram Parks Bell, U.S. Representative
Damon Jesse Gause, World War II war hero
Brantley Gilbert, country music singer, songwriter
Crawford W. Long, physician who first used ether for surgical anesthesia
Brandon Mosley, former Auburn University and former New York Giants offensive lineman
Corey Smith, country music singer, songwriter
Malaki Starks, Safety for the Georgia Bulldogs

References

External links
City of Jefferson official website
The Jackson Herald, local newspaper
Builder of the Nation historical marker

Cities in Georgia (U.S. state)
Cities in Jackson County, Georgia
County seats in Georgia (U.S. state)